Samuel Benton Callahan (January 26, 1833 – February 17, 1911) was an influential, mixed blood Creek politician, born in Mobile, Alabama, to a white father, James Callahan, and Amanda Doyle, a mixed-blood Creek woman. One source says that James was an Irishman who had previously been an architect or a shipbuilder from Pennsylvania, while Amanda was one-fourth Muscogee. His father died while he was young; he and his mother were required to emigrate to Indian Territory in 1836. His mother married Dr. Owen Davis of Sulphur Springs, Texas, where they raised Samuel.

He married Sarah Elizabeth McAllester, the daughter of a Methodist minister in Sulphur Springs, in 1858. then moved back to Indian Territory. During the American Civil War, he served in the First Creek Mounted Volunteers of the Confederate Army, In 1864, he resigned his command to serve in the Second Confederate Congress in Richmond, Virginia, where he would represent both the Creek and Seminole nations as a delegate.

Very soon after Samuel left to join the army, a band of marauders invaded his ranch, burning or looting everything valuable they could found. His wife barely escaped discovery and fled to safety in Sulphur Springs along with a slave nurse, a bag of gold and two small children. Callahan returned to his family in Sulphur Springs, then moved back to Indian Territory after the war. Settling near Muskogee, he resumed farming and ranching, and soon became a significant player in the politics of the Creek Nation. He served in the Creek National Council as clerk of the House of Kings (the Creek equivalent of the Senate) for four years, then as clerk to the Creek Supreme Court. He also acted as executive secretary for three notable principal chiefs, Samuel Checote, Roley McIntosh and Isparhecher. He worked for a time as editor of the Muskogee Indian Journal, starting in 1887. He was the superintendent of the Wealaka Boarding School. In 1901, he was appointed Justice of the Creek Supreme Court.

Samuel Callahan was born in Mobile, Alabama, as a member of the Creek tribe. He represented the Creek and Seminole nations in the Second Confederate Congress. Removed with his tribe to Indian Territory, he fled with his family to Sulphur Springs, Texas during the Civil War. His daughter Sophia Alice Callahan was born during their time in Texas, but at War's end, the family returned to Okmulgee. He served as the editor of the Indian Journal in Muskogee and  He was active in tribal affairs, serving as executive secretary to three principal chiefs of the Muscogee (Creek) Nation and became a justice of the Muscogee Nation Supreme Court in 1901.

Parental family and move to Indian Territory
Samuel was born to James Oliver Callahan and Amanda (Doyle) Callahan (1815 - 1902). Amanda Doyle was born in Georgia (part of the Old Creek Nation) to a white man, Nimrod Doyle and a Creek mother, Susannah Islands.  Little is known of James, other than that he died in Alabama before the Creek Indians were forced to emigrate to Indian Territory. Amanda married James Callahan when she was 16 years old. The Callahans moved to Alabama, where they had two children, but one died in infancy.  Amanda and  Samuel, the surviving son, were forced to emigrate from Alabama to Indian Territory in 1836. Amanda married Dr. Owen Simpson Davis (1810 - 1885) of Sulphur Springs, Texas, which became Samuel's new home. After her husband died, she moved to Muskogee, where she remained with her son for the rest of her life.

Samuel went to live in Texas when his mother remarried. He attended public schools in Sulphur Springs, then went to McKenzie College (Texas) in Clarksville, Texas. After graduation, he became editor of the Sulphur Springs Gazette. After two years at the newspaper, he returned to Indian Territory, where he settled in Okmulgee and began a cattle ranch.

Marriage and family
In 1857, S. B. married Sarah Elizabeth Thornberg, daughter of Methodist minister, William Thornberg in Sulphur Springs. They had eight children:Josephine, James Owen, Jane Evylin, Samuel B., Jr., Sophia Alice, Emma Price, Walter McKenzie, and Edwin Thornberg.

Service to the Confederate States of America
During the American Civil War, Callahan served in the First Creek Mounted Volunteers of the Confederate Army, He was popular among the men of his unit, who were mostly full-blood Creeks. and was commissioned as a first lieutenant. He was promoted to adjutant later that year. He assisted in reorganizing his unit in 1863, and emerged as Captain of Company K, First Creek Regiment. On May 18, 1864, he resigned from the Confederate Army to serve in the Second Confederate Congress in Richmond, Virginia, where he would represent both the Creek and Seminole nations as a delegate, beginning May 30, 1864.

When the New York Times published a list of members of the Confederate Congress in 1864, S. B. Callahan was identified as representing both the Creek and Seminole Nations.

Post Civil War
Callahan remained heavily involved in the governing of the Creek Nation after the Civil War. He was elected to the Creek House of Kings and served from 1868 to 1872. He also served as Private Secretaries for three Creek Principal Chiefs: Roley McIntosh, Samuel Checote and Isparhecher.  After his term ended in the House of Kings, he became clerk of the Creek Supreme Court. He worked for a time as editor of the Muskogee Indian Journal, starting in 1887. He was the superintendent of the Wealaka Boarding School from 1892 to 1894. In 1901, he was elected a justice of the Creek Supreme Court.

Callahan died in Muskogee County, Oklahoma February 17, 1911, where he was buried in Greenhill Cemetery. Just before he died, he was the last living member of the Confederate Congress in Richmond, Virginia. His daughter noted that he was buried wearing his Confederate Army uniform.
 
According to his obituary, Callahan was survived by the following children: J. O. Callahan and K. W. Callahan of Muskogee; Bent Callahan of Morse, Oklahoma; Mrs. Adair of Little Rock; Mrs. Eva Shaw of Waggoner; and Mrs. H. B. Spaulding of Muskogee.

Notes

References

Sources
 http://hd.housedivided.dickinson.edu/node/5303
 

1833 births
1911 deaths
Arkansas Democrats
Oklahoma Democrats
Members of the Confederate States House of Representatives
Muscogee slave owners
Native Americans in the American Civil War
Politicians from Mobile, Alabama
People from Sulphur Springs, Texas
People of Indian Territory
Politicians from Muskogee, Oklahoma
McKenzie College alumni
Confederate States Army officers
20th-century Native Americans
Military personnel from Texas